Noctuides melanochyta is a species of snout moth in the genus Noctuides. It is known from Zaire (including Katakumba, the type location).

References

Moths described in 1933
Epipaschiinae